Eric Magnusson may refer to:

 Eric, Duke of Södermanland (1282–1318), Swedish prince
 Eric XII of Sweden (1339–1359), rival king of Sweden of his father Magnus IV
 Eric II of Norway (1268–1299), king of Norway 1280-1299

See also
Erik Magnuson (football player)
Eric J. Magnuson (lawyer)